Andriy Vyacheslavovych Orlyk (born 6 March 1998, in Shostka, Sumy Oblast, Ukraine) is a cross-country skier and biathlete from Ukraine. He represented Ukraine at the 2018 Winter Olympics.

Career
He took up the sport at age seven in home town of Shostka, Ukraine. Orlyk started his career at major competitions in January 2015 when he finished 4th and 6th at 2015 European Youth Olympic Winter Festival in Steg, Liechtenstein. Next winter he competed at the 2016 Winter Youth Olympics in Lillehammer. There he was 5th in 10km freestyle race.

Andrii participated at two World Championships in 2015 and 2017. Andrii's best personal performance is 59th in 15km classical race in 2015.

At World Cup Orlyk debuted on December 11, 2016, in Davos, Switzerland, where he was 91st in sprint competition. As of February 2018, his best World Cup achievement was 70th rank in 15km classical style in Estonian Otepää on February 19, 2017.

Personal life
He is a student of Sumy State Pedagogical University.

Career results

Winter Olympics

World Championships

References

External links
 

1998 births
Living people
Ukrainian male cross-country skiers
Olympic cross-country skiers of Ukraine
Cross-country skiers at the 2018 Winter Olympics
People from Shostka
Cross-country skiers at the 2016 Winter Youth Olympics
O
Sportspeople from Sumy Oblast
21st-century Ukrainian people